Khandela is a town and municipality in the Sikar district of the Indian state of Rajasthan.

Etymology

Khandela is associated with the origin of Khandelwal Jains (Sarawagi), Khandelwal Banias and Khandelwal Brahmins. The Khandelwal Jains have 84 divisions. The legendary origin of these divisions is given in a 17th-century text, "Shravakotpatti Varnanam".

The name Khandela is believed to have been originated from the sage named Khandel. He had 72 sons from whom 72 clans of Khandelwal originated. Some of those clans are Atolia, Tasid, Akar, Ameria, Mali, Rajoria, Haldia, Raot, Bushar, Pithalia, Vaid, Thekura and Bukhmaria.

Geography
It has an average elevation of 318 metres (1043 feet).

Demographics
 India census, Khandela had a population of 22,475. Males constitute 51% of the population and females 49%.

Khandela has an average literacy rate of 57%, lower than the national average of 59.5%: male literacy is 69%, and female literacy is 45%. In Khandela, 18% of the population is under 6 years of age.

see more 
 Khandelwal
 Sikar
 Shrimadhopur
 Neem-Ka-Thana
 Danta Ramgarh
 Kanwat

References

Cities and towns in Sikar district